Purba Paschim Dakshin is a Bengali spiritual thriller film directed by Rajorshi Dey and produced by Suchandra Vaaniya. This film is based on Ebong Inquisition, compilation of three Paranormal fiction of Avik Sarkar. The film released on 22 November 2019, under the banner of Just Studio. It is the last film acted by Mrinal Mukherjee and debut film of Manabi Bandyopadhyay, India's first transgender college Principal.

Plot
The plot is gradually unfolding through an eventful rail journey. Stuti, a widow suffering from a terminal disease which can be treated by a particular doctor. During her journey, a co passenger narrates her three stories interconnected with each other. The stories somehow relate with the worship of Goddess Kali and the practise of Tantra in Bengal at the time of renowned Bengali scholar and pioneer of Tantra Krishnananda Agamavagisha.

Cast
 Paran Bandopadhyay as Krishnananda Agamavagisha 
 Kamaleshwar Mukherjee as Narrator
 Arpita Chatterjee as Stuti
 Rajesh Sharma as Panditji
 Aryann Bhowmik as Tenia
 Rudraprasad Sengupta as Bhabesh Kaku
 Gaurav Chakrabarty as Atin
 Bidipta Chakraborty
 Manabi Bandyopadhyay
 Suchandraa Vaaniya as Titli
 Mrinal Mukherjee as Dwijottam Mishra
 Damini Basu as Pushpa Di
 Kaushik Kar as Firingia
 Satrajit Sarkar as Khodabox
 Priyanath Mukhopadhyay as Ahmed Khan
 Eshika De as Damori
 Padmanabha Dasgupta

References

Paranormal films
Indian supernatural thriller films
Indian thriller drama films
Films based on Indian novels
2019 films
Bengali-language Indian films
2010s Bengali-language films